is a railway station in the city of Inazawa, Aichi Prefecture, Japan, operated by Meitetsu.

Lines
Ōsato Station is served by the Meitetsu Nagoya Main Line and is 77.5 kilometers from the terminus of the line at Toyohashi Station.

Station layout
The station has two opposed side platforms, with the station building located on the second story of an apartment complex. The station has automated ticket machines, Manaca automated turnstiles and is unattended.

Platforms

Adjacent stations

Station history
On April 1, 1935, the Aichi Electric Railway merged with the Nagoya Railway (the forerunner of present-day Meitetsu). The station changed the kanji of its name to the present configuration on November 2, 1943. The station has been unattended since February 2004.

Passenger statistics
In fiscal 2017, the station was used by an average of 3,935 passengers daily.

Surrounding area
 Ōsato Junior High School
 Kiyosu Station
 Ōsato Nishi Elementary School

See also
 List of Railway Stations in Japan

References

External links

 Official web page 

Railway stations in Japan opened in 1928
Railway stations in Aichi Prefecture
Stations of Nagoya Railroad
Inazawa